Krasnolipka  is a village in the administrative district of Gmina Rawicz, within Rawicz County, Greater Poland Voivodeship, in west-central Poland.

The village has a population of 3.

References

Krasnolipka